Maple Hill is an unincorporated community in Emmet County, Iowa, United States.

History
Maple Hill got its start in 1899, following construction of the railroad through that territory. Maple Hill's population was 15 in 1902, and 27 in 1925.

References

Unincorporated communities in Emmet County, Iowa
Unincorporated communities in Iowa